Ivan Jukić (born 21 June 1996) is a professional footballer who plays as a winger for Bosnian Premier League club Zrinjski Mostar. Born in Croatia, he represented Bosnia and Herzegovina at youth international level.

Club career

Early career
Jukić started training football in his native Vitez at the age of 6, before he moved with his family to Dugi Rat in Croatia, where he joined the local club. At the age of 15, he moved to career at Split, for which he debuted professionally on 15 February 2014 against Dinamo Zagreb, at the age of 17. In 2016, he had a brief loan stint with Imotski. On 7 December 2014, he scored his first senior goal in a city derby against Hajduk Split.

Korona Kielce
In July 2017, Jukić signed a two-year deal with Polish Ekstraklasa club Korona Kielce on a free transfer. On 17 July, he debuted in a league game against Zagłębie Lubin. Two weeks later, he scored his first goal for the team against Cracovia. Jukić left the club in January 2020.

Sarajevo
On 23 January 2020, Jukić signed a two-and-a-half year contract with Bosnian Premier League club Sarajevo. He made his official debut for Sarajevo in a 6–2 league win against Tuzla City on 22 February 2020. On 1 June 2020, Jukić won his first league title with Sarajevo, though after the 2019–20 Bosnian Premier League season was ended abruptly due to the COVID-19 pandemic in Bosnia and Herzegovina and after which Sarajevo were by default crowned league champions for a second consecutive time. On 18 June 2020, he extended his contract with the club until June 2022. Jukić scored his first goal for Sarajevo on 23 August 2020 in a league game against Velež Mostar.

International career
Jukić played for the Bosnia and Herzegovina U21 national team under head coach Vinko Marinović. He made five appearances for the team, not scoring a goal.

Career statistics

Club

Honours
Sarajevo
Bosnian Premier League: 2019–20
Bosnian Cup: 2020–21

Zrinjski Mostar
Bosnian Premier League: 2021–22

References

External links

1996 births
Living people
People from Vitez
Association football wingers
Croatian footballers
Croatia youth international footballers
Bosnia and Herzegovina footballers
Bosnia and Herzegovina under-21 international footballers
RNK Split players
NK Imotski players
Korona Kielce players
FK Sarajevo players
HŠK Zrinjski Mostar players
Croatian Football League players
First Football League (Croatia) players
Ekstraklasa players
Premier League of Bosnia and Herzegovina players
Bosnia and Herzegovina expatriate footballers
Expatriate footballers in Croatia
Expatriate footballers in Poland
Bosnia and Herzegovina expatriate sportspeople in Croatia
Bosnia and Herzegovina expatriate sportspeople in Poland